The Attacotti (variously spelled Atticoti, Attacoti, Atecotti, Atticotti, Atecutti, etc.) were a people who despoiled Roman Britain between 364 and 368, along with the Scoti, Picts, Saxons, Roman military deserters and the indigenous Britons themselves. The marauders were defeated by Count Theodosius in 368. Their origin and the location and the extent of their territory are uncertain.

Units of Attacotti are recorded about 400 AD in the Notitia Dignitatum, and one tombstone of a soldier of the Atecutti is known. Their existence as a distinct people is given additional credence by two incidental references to them as cannibals and as having wives in common in the writings of Saint Jerome.

Ammianus: Roman Britain in 364–369 

The historian Ammianus provides an account of the tumultuous situation in Britain between 364 and 369, and he describes a corrupt and treasonous administration, native British troops (the Areani) in collaboration with the barbarians, and a Roman military whose troops had deserted and joined in the general banditry. The situation arose as a consequence of the failed imperial power-grab (350-353) by Magnentius (303-353), followed by a bloody and arbitrary purge conducted by Paulus Catena in an attempt to root out potential sympathisers of Magnentius in Britain, and aggravated by the political machinations of the Roman administrator Valentinus.

Ammianus describes the marauders as bands moving from place to place in search of loot. Nevertheless, one Roman commander was killed in a pitched battle and another was taken prisoner in an ambush and killed. (See Great Conspiracy.) As there was no longer an effective military force in the province, a substantial one was sent from Gaul under Count Theodosius, who quickly and ruthlessly restored order. Theodosius then focused his efforts on the repair of political problems within the province.

Notitia Dignitatum: Roman auxilia palatina 
The Notitia Dignitatum is a list of offices of the early 5th century Roman Empire, and includes the locations of the offices and the staff (including military units) assigned to them. The names of several auxilia palatina resemble that of the Attacotti who were mentioned by Ammianus, and in an 1876 publication, historian Otto Seeck assigned the name Atecotti to various spellings ("acecotti", "atecocti", "attecotti", "attcoetti", "[illegible]ti", and "arecotti") in the Notitia Dignitatum, and documented his assignments within the publication. This produced four conjectural occurrences of Atecotti-related units:

 Atecotti
 Atecotti juniores Gallicani
 Atecotti Honoriani seniores
 Atecotti Honoriani juniores

The discovery of a contemporary funerary dedication to a soldier of the "unit of Atecutti" (emended from "Ategutti") at Thessalonica, in the Roman Diocese of Illyricum, supports this reconstruction, as the Notitia Dignitatum places one Atecotti unit in that diocese.

Saint Jerome: incidental references 
St. Jerome was a Christian apologist whose writings contain two incidental references to the Attacotti. His account is particularly noteworthy because he was in Roman Gaul c.365-369/70, while the Attacotti were known to be in Britain until 368 and may have entered Roman military service soon after. Thus it is credible that Jerome had seen Attacotti soldiers and had heard Roman accounts of the recent fighting in Britain.

In his Letter LXIX. To Oceanus, he is urging a responsible attitude towards marriage, at one point saying that one should not be "like the Scots [ie, the Irish Scoti] and the Atacotti, and the people of Plato's Republic, to have community of wives and no discrimination of children, nay more, to be aware of any semblance even of matrimony".

In his treatise Against Jovinianus he describes the dietary habits of several peoples and includes a statement that he had heard that the Attacotti ate human flesh. Earlier in the same passage he describes a different people as eating "fat white worms with blackish heads", and others as eating "land-crocodiles" and "green lizards". Ancient writers sometimes ascribed exotic habits to far-away peoples in their works. Strabo, for example, said in passing that some Sarmatians and Scythians were cannibals, while others ate no meat at all.

De Situ Britanniae: a spurious reference 

De Situ Britanniae was a fictitious account of the peoples and places of Roman Britain. It was published in 1757, after having been made available in London in 1749. Accepted as genuine for more than one hundred years, it was virtually the only source of information for northern Britain (i.e., modern Scotland) for the time period, and some historians eagerly incorporated its spurious information into their own accounts of history. The Attacotti were mentioned in De Situ Britanniae, and their homeland was specified as just north of the Firth of Clyde, near southern Loch Lomond, in the region of Dumbartonshire.

This information was combined with legitimate historical mentions of the Attacotti to produce inaccurate histories and to make baseless conjectures. For example, Edward Gibbon combined De Situ Britanniae with St. Jerome's description of the Attacotti by musing on the possibility that a ‘race of cannibals’ had once dwelt in the neighbourhood of Glasgow.

Possible Irish connection 

Perhaps as early as the 17th century, and certainly in the 18th and 19th centuries, some Irish scholars (Charles O'Conor and John O'Donovan, for example) had suggested that the origin of the Attacotti might lie in Ireland. This was based on the perceived similarity between Latin Attacotti and the Old Irish term aithechthúatha, a generic designation for certain Irish population groups, usually translated "rent-paying tribes", "vassal communities" or "tributary peoples". In the context of well-attested Irish raids on the western coast of Britain in the late Roman period, it was suggested that one or more of these population groups might be the raiders reported by Ammianus in the 360s.

The thesis was given impetus when historian Charles O'Conor promoted it in the late 18th century. However, this remained controversial among scholars into the late 19th century.

Later scholarship has criticised the possible connection between Latin Attacotti and aithechthúatha on etymological grounds. Early scholars had based their arguments on the Old Irish that was known from medieval manuscripts rather than on the largely hypothetical  Primitive Irish used in the 4th century when the Attacotti were in Britain.

Knowledge and understanding of the history of the Irish language were revolutionised from the end of the 19th century, largely owing to the efforts of Rudolf Thurneysen (1857–1940). He hypothesised that Attacotti and aithechthúatha are unconnected, and that the Primitive Irish equivalent to aithechthúatha would be *Ateûiācotōtās.  This, in his opinion, is too far removed from the Latin form Attacotti in Ammianus. More recent research has shown that some of the Irish population groups involved in the raiding and settlement of Roman and/or sub-Roman Britain could be classified as aithechthúatha, however, problems of chronology and identification persist.

References

Bibliography

 

 

 
 
 
Freeman, Philip (2002), 'Who Were the Atecotti?' in J.F. Nagy (ed.), Identifying the "Celtic" ([Celtic Studies Association of North America Yearbook 2] Dublin, 2002), 111—114.
MacNeill, Eoin, "Early Irish Population Groups: their nomenclature, classification and chronology", in Proceedings of the Royal Irish Academy (C) 29. 1911. pp. 59–114
Scharf, Ralf (1995), 'Aufrüstung und Truppenbenennung unter Stilicho: Das Beispiel der Atecotti-Truppen', Tyche 10: 161—178.

Tribes of ancient Britain
Tribes of ancient Ireland
Historical Celtic peoples
Mercenary units and formations of antiquity
Incidents of cannibalism